Camila Vargas Palomo (born 22 September 1986, Falcón, Venezuela) is a Salvadoran rower. She competed in the single sculls race at the 2008 and 2012 Summer Olympics.  At the 2008 Olympics she finished in 22nd place, while at the 2012 Summer Olympics she placed 4th in Final C and 16th overall.

References

1986 births
Living people
Salvadoran female rowers
Olympic rowers of El Salvador
Rowers at the 2008 Summer Olympics
Rowers at the 2012 Summer Olympics
People from Falcón
Rowers at the 2007 Pan American Games
Pan American Games medalists in rowing
Pan American Games bronze medalists for El Salvador
21st-century Salvadoran women